Diaphus jenseni, the Jensen's lanternfish, is a species of lanternfish 
found in the Indo-Pacific, the Southeast Atlantic Ocean and there South China Sea.

Size

Etymology
The fish is named in honor of Danish zoologist Adolf Severin Jensen (1866–1953), a member of the committee that edited the oceanographic reports of the Dana expeditions.

References

Myctophidae
Taxa named by Åge Vedel Tåning
Fish described in 1932